In linguistic typology, a verb–subject–object (VSO) language has its most typical sentences arrange their elements in that order, as in Ate Sam oranges (Sam ate oranges). VSO is the third-most common word order among the world's languages, after SOV (as in Hindi and Japanese) and SVO (as in English and Mandarin Chinese).

Language families in which all or many of their members are VSO include the following:
 the Insular Celtic languages (including Irish, Scottish Gaelic, Manx, Welsh, Cornish and Breton)
 the Afroasiatic languages (including Berber, Assyrian, Egyptian, Arabic, Biblical Hebrew, and Ge'ez)
 the Austronesian languages (including Tagalog, Visayan, Pangasinan, Kapampangan, Kadazan Dusun, Hawaiian, Māori, and Tongan).
 the Mayan languages (including Classic Maya)
 the Oto-Manguean languages (including Zapotec languages and Mixtecan languages)
 the Salishan languages
 many Mesoamerican languages
 many Nilotic languages (including Nandi and Maasai)

Many languages, such as Greek, have relatively free word order, where VSO is one of many possible orders. Other languages, such as Spanish and Romanian, allow rather free subject-verb inversion. However, the most basic, common, and unmarked form in these languages is SVO, so they are classified as SVO languages.

Languages

Semitic languages
Standard Arabic is an example of a language that uses VSO:

 Arabic script is written right-to-left

Another Semitic language, Biblical Hebrew, uses VSO, as in Genesis 1:1, which is seen here, and many other places in the Tanakh:

et is a particle marking the direct object of the verb.

 The Hebrew script is written from right to left.

Romance languages 
VSO is one of six possible word orders in Latin. The order can appear in Old French and Spanish but not Italian.

Spanish 
Word order is rather flexible in Spanish, and VSO word order is allowed in practically all situations, but it is particularly common if some element other than the subject or the direct object functions as the subject of predication. Some sentences resemble V2 word order, with an adverb or oblique argument at the front:

Todos los días compra Juan el diario. Every day buys Juan the newspaper, “Juan buys the newspaper every day”
Ayer presentó María su renuncia. Yesterday handed-in Maria her resignation, Maria handed in her resignation yesterday.
A María le regaló su abuelo un caballo de pura raza. To María dat.cl. gave her grandfather a horse of pure breed, María's grandfather gave her a purebred horse.

Here are other examples of VSO in Spanish:

Me devolvió María el libro que le presté. To-me returned María the book that to-her (I) lent, “María returned to me the book that I lent her.”
Se comieron los niños todo el pastel. Ate up the boys all the cake, “The boys ate up all the cake.”

Celtic languages
In Welsh, some tenses use simple verbs, which are found at the beginning of the sentence and are followed by the subject and any objects. An example is the preterite:

Other tenses may use compound verbs in which the conjugated form of usually bod (to be) precedes the subject and other verb-nouns come after the subject. Objects then follow the final verb-noun. Here is the usual method of forming the present tense:

In Irish, phrases also use VSO:

In Irish, in forming a question, the same order is used (with an interrogative particle in front):

The typological classification of Breton syntax is problematic. It has been claimed that Breton has an underlying VSO character, but it appears at first sight that V2 is the most frequent pattern. That arises as a result of a process usually involving the subject noun phrase being fronted. It has been suggested that the fronting has arisen from a development in which clefting and fronting, which are very common in Celtic languages, became completely pervasive. A very similar development is seen in literary Middle Welsh but did not continue into Modern Welsh.

Inversion to VSO
There is some tendency in many languages to switch constructions for emphasis. Particularly, sentences in English poetry are sometimes written in VSO, and Early Modern English explicitly reflects the tacit VSO order that is found in Modern English by suppressing the imperative's now-understood subject. For example, "Gather ye rosebuds while ye may" contrasts with modern "Gather rosebuds while you may".

Arabic sentences use either SVO or VSO, depending on whether the subject or the verb is more important. Sociolinguistic factors also influence sentence structure especially since colloquial varieties of Arabic generally prefer SVO, but VSO is more common in Standard Arabic.

Non-VSO languages that use VSO in questions include English and many other Germanic languages such as German and Dutch, as well as French, Finnish, Maká, and Emilian.

In languages with V2 word order, such as most Germanic languages except for Modern English, as well as Ingush and Oʼodham, the verb is always the second element in a main clause. the subject precedes the verb by default, but if another word or phrase is put at the front of the clause, the subject is moved to the position immediately after the verb. For example, the German sentence Ich esse oft Rinderbraten (I often eat roast beef) is in the standard SVO word order, with the adverb oft (often) immediately after the verb. However, if that adverb is moved to the beginning of the sentence for emphasis, the subject ich (I) is moved to the third position, which places the sentence in VSO order: Oft esse ich Rinderbraten.

See also
Polish notation
:Category:Verb–subject–object languages

References

 
Word order